Lhodrak Kharchu Monastery is a Buddhist  Nyingmapa  Monastery of Jangter Tradition based in Bumthang District Central Bhutan. The monastery overlooks Jakar Dzong and the valley of Jakar town. 

The monastery was built in the 1980s in the traditional Dzong architectural style following a huge support by the gracious Fourth King of Bhutan, Jigme Singye Wangchuk and funding from International and Bhutanese patrons as well.  As of 2006 the monastery was still not entirely completed. Nevertheless the monastery is home to more than 250 monks, many of them being children and young adults.

References

External links
Photograph

Buddhist monasteries in Bhutan
Tibetan Buddhist monasteries
Unfinished buildings and structures
Tibetan Buddhism in Bhutan